Rudolph Michael Challenger (October 2, 1928 – August 22, 2012) was an African-American supporting actor who had roles in various projects over the course of his thirty-four year career in film and television in Hollywood. He appeared on such shows as Sanford and Son, Kojak, Lou Grant, and The Fall Guy. He also appeared in the 1970s blaxploitation flicks Detroit 9000 (1973) and the highly successful box office hit film Sheba Baby (1975), opposite actress Pam Grier.

Career
The New York City-born and raised Challenger first got his acting start on the stage in the early 1960s, performing in the off-Broadway plays The Rise and Fall Of The City Of Mahagonny, Along Came A Spider, and the Jacques Levy-directed Scuba Duba, where he appeared alongside the likes of future television and film stars such as Judd Hirsch (of ABC's Taxi), Conrad Bain (of NBC's Diff'rent Strokes), and Jerry Orbach (of NBC's Law & Order). The play, which ran for 692 performances, from October 10, 1967, to June 8, 1969, earned a 1968 Theatre World Award for actress Brenda Smiley, who also appeared in the acclaimed play with Challenger. He also appeared in the Broadway productions Tambourines In Grey (1963), Do I Hear A Waltz? (1965), Tiger, Tiger, Burning Bright (1963), and four-time Tony Award winning, Robert Lewis directed On a Clear Day You Can See Forever (1965) which ran for 280 performances, from October 17, 1965, to June 11, 1966. Challenger was married to veteran British actress Lisa Davis Waltz from December 31, 1973, to September 14, 1978, after almost two and a half years of separation.

Challenger retired from acting on both stage and screen in 1989. He latterly resided in Southern California with his wife, Charlotte. Challenger died in Van Nuys, California on August 22, 2012, at the age of 83.

References

External links

1928 births
2012 deaths
20th-century African-American people
21st-century African-American people
African-American male actors
American male film actors
American male stage actors
American male television actors
Male actors from New York City